Abraham Hart (December 15, 1810 in Philadelphia, Pennsylvania– July 22, 1885 in Long Branch, New Jersey) was a United States publisher, a member of the noted firm of Carey & Hart.

Biography
He was of Dutch parentage. As a boy, he was taken into the employ of the publishing firm of Carey, Lea & Carey. In 1829 the firm divided its business, and a partnership was formed between Hart and Edward L. Carey, the junior member of the old firm. This house of Carey & Hart became the best known publishing house in the United States. It was the first to collect the fugitive essays of Macaulay, Jeffrey, Mackintosh, Carlyle, and others and publish them in separate volumes. Carey died in 1845, and Hart continued the publishing business until 1854, when he retired.

After retiring from the publishing business, he involved himself with industrial enterprises, serving in an executive capacity at the Centennial Button-hole Machine Company and the American Button-hole Machine Company. Hart was an active member of the Jewish community in Philadelphia, being president for a time of the Jewish Congregation Mickvéh Israel,, and assisting in Jewish educational and charitable enterprises.

In 1831, he married Rebecca Cohen Isaacks. He died in 1885 and is interred in the Mikveh Israel Cemetery (11th and Federal) in South Philadelphia.

References

External links
 
 

1810 births
1885 deaths
Businesspeople from Philadelphia
American people of Dutch-Jewish descent
American publishers (people)
19th-century American businesspeople